Las Edades del Hombre is a religious foundation that was created to promote the sacred art of Castilla y León (Spain). The initiative was an idea of José Jiménez Lozano and José Velicia.

Exhibitions
Since 1988 the foundation Las Edades del Hombre has organized a number of exhibitions, in Castile and León and abroad.
In 2019 the exhibition is in Lerma.

External links
 Official page of Las Edades del Hombre

References

Exhibitions in Spain
Christian art
Castile and León
Spanish art
Foundations based in Spain
1988 establishments in Spain
Arts organizations established in 1988
Christian organizations established in 1988
Cultural tourism in Spain